Darren Brown may refer to:

 Darren Brown (musician) (1962–2006), English singer and guitarist of Mega City Four
 Darren Brown (footballer) (born 1965), Australian rules footballer
 Darren Brown (rugby league) (born 1969), Australian rugby league player
 Derren Brown (born 1971), English illusionist and mentalist who previous used the stage name Darren V. Brown

See also
 Daren Brown (born 1967), American baseball manager